Henry Township is one of the nineteen townships of Wood County, Ohio, United States.  The 2010 census found 4,175 people in the township, 743 of whom lived in the unincorporated portions of the township.

Geography
Located in the southern part of the county, it borders the following townships:
Liberty Township - north
Portage Township - northeast corner
Bloom Township - east
Allen Township, Hancock County - southeast
Portage Township, Hancock County - south
Pleasant Township, Hancock County - southwest corner
Jackson Township - west
Milton Township - northwest

The village of North Baltimore is located in southeastern Henry Township.

Name and history
Henry Township was established in 1836, and named after Henry Shaw, a county official. It is the only Henry Township statewide.

Government
The township is governed by a three-member board of trustees, who are elected in November of odd-numbered years to a four-year term beginning on the following January 1. Two are elected in the year after the presidential election and one is elected in the year before it. There is also an elected township fiscal officer, who serves a four-year term beginning on April 1 of the year after the election, which is held in November of the year before the presidential election. Vacancies in the fiscal officership or on the board of trustees are filled by the remaining trustees.

References

External links
County website

Townships in Wood County, Ohio
Townships in Ohio